The Porto Alegre Brazil Temple is the 102nd operating temple of the Church of Jesus Christ of Latter-day Saints (LDS Church).

The Porto Alegre Temple overlooks the city from the east toward a large river and port for which the city is named. It has an exterior of white granite and a single spire topped with a statue of the angel Moroni.

History
Temple construction began on May 2, 1998.  The temple was dedicated by LDS Church president Gordon B. Hinckley on December 17, 2000. The temple sits on a hill in Porto Alegre's Vila Jardim district.

The Porto Alegre Temple was the last temple of the LDS Church to be dedicated in the 20th century.

In 2020, the Porto Alegre Brazil Temple was closed temporarily during the year in response to the coronavirus pandemic.

See also

 Comparison of temples of The Church of Jesus Christ of Latter-day Saints
 List of temples of The Church of Jesus Christ of Latter-day Saints
 List of temples of The Church of Jesus Christ of Latter-day Saints by geographic region
 Temple architecture (Latter-day Saints)
 The Church of Jesus Christ of Latter-day Saints in Brazil

References

External links
Official Porto Alegre Brazil Temple page
Porto Alegre Brazil Temple at ChurchofJesusChristTemples.org
News article from 12/01/2000 about the Porto Alegre Temple Open House(in Portuguese)

20th-century Latter Day Saint temples
Buildings and structures in Porto Alegre
Temples (LDS Church) completed in 2000
Temples (LDS Church) in Brazil
2000 establishments in Brazil